The Ministry of Finance of the Republic of Lithuania is a government department of the Republic of Lithuania. Its operations are authorized by the Constitution of the Republic of Lithuania, decrees issued by the President and Prime Minister, and laws passed by the Seimas (Parliament). Its mission is to formulate and implement an effective policy of public finance in order to ensure the country's macroeconomic stability and economic development. The current head of the Ministry is Gintarė Skaistė.

Ministers

References

 
Finance
Lithuania